Ochicanthon ceylonicus, is a species of dung beetle found in Sri Lanka.

Description
This small oval species has an average length of about 4.2 to 4.4 mm. Body black and shiny. Head with annular setiferous punctures. Laterally, pronotum weakly convex where the outline at base almost in line with that of elytral suture. Latero-basal paramarginal ridge is absent. Pronotum with annular setiferous punctures. Elytra moderately convex with shallow and narrow striae. Pygidium with shallow setiferous punctures.

References 

Scarabaeinae
Insects of Sri Lanka
Insects described in 2011